In mathematics, Ismail polynomials may refer to one of the families of orthogonal polynomials studied by Mourad Ismail, such as:

Al-Salam–Ismail polynomials
Chihara-Ismail polynomials
Rogers–Askey–Ismail polynomials